Sajha Puraskar is a literary award given by Sajha Publications. It is presented annually to the best book published by Sajha Publication.

History 
It was established in 1967 and the first award was given to Bhupi Sherchan for his book Ghumne Mechmathi Andho Manche in 1969. Banira Giri is the first woman to receive the Sajha Puraskar. In 2013, the prize money was 49,000 Nepalese rupees (NPR).

Recipients

See also 

 Madan Puraskar
 Padmashree Sahitya Puraskar
 Jagadamba Shree Puraskar

References

Notes 

 

Nepalese literary awards
1967 establishments in Nepal
Awards established in 1967